Brett Moyer (born January 1, 1984) of Ridley Park, Pennsylvania is a professional lacrosse player for the Philadelphia Wings in the National Lacrosse League, and the Philadelphia Barrage in the Major League Lacrosse. Moyer was a three-time All American at Hofstra University.

Collegiate career 

Moyer attended Hofstra University  where he was a starter for four years, and a three-time All-American. While at Hofsta, he was named CAA Defender of the Year twice (in 2005 and 2006).  In 2006, as a senior, he was First-Team All-American, and appeared in the 2006 USILA North-South Senior All-Star Game, where he was named the game's Most Valuable Player. With Moyer anchoring a defense which gave up less than 7 goals a game in 2006, Hofstra won 17 games in a row, reached #2 in the national polls and reached the quarterfinals of the NCAA tournament.

Moyer was also a member of the 2003 U.S. Men's Under-19 Team International Lacrosse Federation World Champions.

Professional career 

Moyer attended Ridley High School (outside of Philadelphia) where he was teammates with Bill McGlone and became an All American. The pair won two straight Pennsylvania State Titles and were both Offensive and Defensive MVPs two years in a row respectively.

After being acquired in a trade prior to the 2006 season, Moyer was part of a defensive unit that helped the Philadelphia Barrage win the MLL championship in 2006, and 2007.

The Philadelphia Wings acquired Moyer as a free agent prior to the 2008 NLL season

Acting career
Moyer acted in all the major lacrosse scenes in A Warrior's Heart in 2011.

Statistics

MLL

NLL

See also
Lacrosse in Pennsylvania
Hofstra 2006 - Laxpower.com

References

1984 births
Living people
Hofstra Pride men's lacrosse players
American lacrosse players
Major League Lacrosse players
Philadelphia Wings players
Lacrosse players from Pennsylvania
Ridley High School alumni
People from Ridley Park, Pennsylvania
Sportspeople from Delaware County, Pennsylvania
Philadelphia Barrage players